The Sami Bridge is a cable-stayed bridge that carries the European route E75 across the Tana River between Troms og Finnmark county in Norway and Utsjoki in Finland.

The Sami Bridge was opened in 1993. Before this, there was a ferry during summer and ice road in winter.

External links

Road Viaducts & Bridges in Norway (> 500 m)
An image of the bridge
Another image

Road bridges in Troms og Finnmark
Cable-stayed bridges in Norway
Cable-stayed bridges in Finland
International bridges
Finland–Norway border crossings
Bridges completed in 1993
1993 establishments in Norway
Utsjoki
Buildings and structures in Lapland (Finland)